Panicum hirticaule is a species of grass known by the common names Mexican panicgrass and roughstalked witchgrass. It is also known as the Sonoran millet, and is cultivated as a cereal crop in the American Southwest.

Distribution
In North America it is native to the Southwestern United States and Mexico. Its distribution extends throughout Central and South America. It grows in many types of habitat, including disturbed areas. There is evidence that it was eaten, cultivated and possibly domesticated by Native Americans.

Description
This is an annual bunchgrass growing 10 to 80 centimeters tall and bearing hairy leaves up to 15 centimeters long. The inflorescence is a branching panicle up to 12 centimeters long with rounded spikelets at nodes.

References

External links
Jepson Manual Treatment - Panicum hirticaule
USDA Plants Profile: Panicum hirticaule
Grass Manual Treatment - Panicum hirticaule

hirticaule
Bunchgrasses of North America
Bunchgrasses of South America
Flora of Central America
Grasses of Mexico
Grasses of the United States
Native grasses of California
Native grasses of Texas
Flora of the Sonoran Deserts
Flora of the Southwestern United States
Natural history of the Colorado Desert
Millets
Cereals